Gustavo Domínguez Lemos (born 17 October 1980 in O Porriño) is a Spanish former professional cyclist.

Major results
2003
1st Overall GP Internacional Paredes Rota dos Móveis
1st Stage 1
2006
3rd Vuelta a Extremadura

References

External links

1980 births
Living people
Spanish male cyclists
Sportspeople from O Porriño
Cyclists from Galicia (Spain)